Uwe Herter (born 19 July 1961) is a German Paralympic archer.

He has competed once at the Summer Paralympics, three times at the World Para Archery Championships and twice at the Para Continental Championships. In the 2016 Summer Paralympics he finished fourth in the men's W1 compound, being beaten to a bronze medal by Peter Kinik.

References

External links
 
 
 

1961 births
Living people
German male archers
Paralympic archers of Germany
Archers at the 2016 Summer Paralympics
People from Balingen
Sportspeople from Tübingen (region)